Torsion field can refer to:

 A torsion tensor in differential geometry.
 The field used in Einstein–Cartan theory and other alternatives to general relativity that involve torsion of spacetime
 Torsion field (pseudoscience), a field alleged to make faster-than-light communication and paranormal phenomena possible